The 1968 United States men's Olympic basketball team represented the United States at the 1968 Summer Olympics in Mexico City, Mexico from October 13 to 25, 1968. Team USA won its seventh consecutive gold medal.

1968 USA men's Olympic games roster

The roster was led by future NBA All-Stars Haywood (19 years old) and White (21 years old), who led the team in scoring, with an average of 16.3 points and 11.7 points respectively. Haywood was the youngest player to make the USA basketball team at the time.

USA Basketball also selected 6 alternates to the U.S. squad; Tom Black of the Goodyear Wingfoots, George Carter of the US Army, Joe Hamilton of Christian College of the Southwest (TX) Junior College, Dan Issel of the University of Kentucky, Rick Mount of Purdue University and Charlie Paulk of Northeastern Oklahoma College.

Notably absent from the squad or the list of alternates were Pete Maravich, who led the NCAA in scoring during his sophomore season at LSU and would go on to set the NCAA career scoring record of 3,667 points, and reigning NCAA Champion and Player of the Year Lew Alcindor, who chose not to try out for the Olympic team in protest of anti-Black racism in the US.

Staff
Head coach: Hank Iba, Oklahoma State University
Assistant coach: Henry Vaughn, Goodyear Wingfoots
Assistant coach: John McLendon, Cleveland State University
Team Manager: Ben Carnevale, New York University
Assistant Manager: G. Russel Lyons, Boulder, CO
Athletic Trainer: Whitey Gwynne, West Virginia University

Results
 beat , 81–46
 beat , 93–36
 beat , 96–75
 beat , 73–58
 beat , 95–60
 beat , 100–61
 beat , 61–56
 beat , 75–63
 beat , 65–50

By obtaining an 8–0 record, Team USA would earn its right to play in the gold medal game. The team who won the game would receive the gold medal, and the team who lost the game would receive the silver medal.

Final standings

1.  (9–0)	
2.  (7–2) (silver medalists)
3.  (8–1) (bronze medalists)
4.  (6–3)
5.  (7–2)
6.  (5–4)
7.  (5–4)
8.  (5–4)
9.  (5–4)
10.  (4–5)
11.  (3–6)
12.  (2–7)
13.  (3–6)
14.  (2–7)
15.  (1–8)
16.  (0–9)

See also
Basketball at the 1968 Summer Olympics

References

External links
 USA Basketball, official site

United States at the Olympic men's basketball tournament
United
olympic